Nine Mile River may refer to:

Canada
 Nine Mile River, Nova Scotia
 Nine Mile River (Ontario)

United Kingdom
 Nine Mile River, Wiltshire

United States
 Nine Mile Creek (Utah), in Ninemile Canyon

See also
 Lower Nine Mile River, Nova Scotia
 Upper Nine Mile River, Nova Scotia
 Ninemile Creek (disambiguation)